is a former mayor of Sakai, Osaka in Japan. He was first elected in 2005.

References 
 

1939 births
Living people
Mayors of places in Osaka Prefecture
Osaka University alumni
People from Toyonaka, Osaka